So Long Ago is the solo debut album from Scottish rock musician Ricky Ross.  Ross later founded Deacon Blue.

Track listing
All songs written by Ricky Ross:

  "Something About Ireland" – 2:37
  "A Week in Politics" – 4:44
  "Checkout Girls" – 3:24
  "Don't Look Back" – 4:17
  "Little India" – 3:20
  "Surprised by Joy" – 4:01
  "Some People Last Winter" – 3:13
  "Vision On" – 4:38
  "I Love You Like a Son" – 3:55
  "The Germans Are Out Today" – 5:56
  "Chairman Mao's Vacation" – 1:55

Personnel
 Ricky Ross – vocals, keyboards, producer
 Graeme Duffin – guitar
 Craig Smillie – guitar
 Malcolm Lindsay – guitar
 Stuart Duffin – bass
 Ewen Vernal – bass
 Malcom Duffin – drums
 Zara Ross – accordion
 Carol Moore – backing vocals

1984 debut albums
Ricky Ross (musician) albums